Hannah van Kampen (born 8 May 1993) is a New Zealand cyclist. She represented New Zealand at the 2016 Summer Paralympics as the sighted pilot for Amanda Cameron. As the sighted pilot for Emma Foy, she won a gold and bronze medal at the 2019 UCI Para-cycling Track World Championships in Apeldoorn, and a gold and silver medal at the 2019 UCI Para-cycling Road World Championships in Emmen, Netherlands.

Van Kampen and Foy retained their world title in the women's individual pursuit tandem at the 2020 UCI Para-cycling Track World Championships. They also claimed the bronze medal in the women's time trial tandem.

References

External links
  (archive)
 

1993 births
Living people
New Zealand female cyclists
Paralympic sighted guides
Paralympic cyclists of New Zealand
Cyclists at the 2016 Summer Paralympics
Sportspeople from the Hawke's Bay Region
21st-century New Zealand women